Cosmodes is a genus of moths of the family Noctuidae.

Species
 Cosmodes elegans (Donovan, 1805)

References
Natural History Museum Lepidoptera genus database
Cosmodes at funet

Hadeninae